The Salmson water-cooled aero-engines, produced in France by Société des Moteurs Salmson from 1908 until 1920, were a series of pioneering aero-engines: unusually combining water-cooling with the radial arrangement of their cylinders.

History
Henri Salmson, a manufacturer of water pumps, was engaged by Georges Marius Henri-Georges Canton and Pierre Unné, a pair of Swiss engineers, to produce engines to their design. Their initial efforts were on barrel engines, but these failed to meet expectations due to low reliability and high fuel consumption caused by internal friction.

A new 7-cylinder water-cooled radial design was then developed by Canton and Unné. The range was expanded to produce 9-cylinder models, and also two-row 14-cylinder and 18-cylinder engines. By 1912 the Salmson A9 was producing around 120 brake horsepower; while competitive with rival designs from French companies, Salmson, Canton and Unné decided to develop more powerful engines as their rivals were concentrating on engines of lower power.

The engines were produced at Salmson's factory at Billancourt, which was expanded during the First World War, and a second factory was opened at Villeurbanne. The Salmson-(Canton-Unne) series of water-cooled engines were also built by licensees in Russia and in Great Britain at the Dudbridge Iron Works Limited at Stroud in Gloucestershire between 1914 and 1918.

Applications

Data from:LA SOCIETE DES MOTEURS SALMSON
Aircraft powered by Salmson water-cooled engines included:
Salmson 9A
Salmson-Moineau S.M.1
Salmson-Moineau S.M.2
Salmson 9B
Short S.74
Short type 135
Short type 830
Salmson 9C
Farman 60
Salmson 9M
Blackburn type L
Bréguet U2
Breguet 14 prototype
Voisin LA 3
Salmson 9P
Farman HF.27
Voisin LA 5
Salmson 9R
Anatra DS
Lebed 12
Salmson 9Z
Besson H-5
Caudron C.23
Farman HF.30
Farman 60
Hanriot HD.3
Hanriot H.26
Latécoère 3
Salmson 2 Berline
Salmson 2A2
Vickers Vimy prototype
Voisin Triplane
Salmson 2M7
Kennedy Giant
Sopwith type C
Sopwith Bat Boat II
Short type 166
Sopwith type 860
Wight Navyplane
Salmson 18Cm
Hanriot H.25

Variants and specifications
Some sources named the radial versions as Salmson (Canton-Unne) which refers to the Swiss engineers which engaged Salmson to build engines to their designs.

Specifications (Salmson 9Z)

See also
Salmson air-cooled aero-engines
List of aircraft engines

Notes

References and further reading 

  La société des moteurs Salmson at Hydro-Retro.Net
 Salmson Z-9 at the Aircraft Engine Historical Society

 

1910s aircraft piston engines
Salmson aircraft engines
Water-cooled radial engines